Center Township is one of eighteen townships in Allamakee County, Iowa, USA.  At the 2010 census, its population was 329.

History
Center Township was organized in 1856.

Geography
According to the USGS, it contains nine cemeteries: Center Baptist, Elon, Faegre Prairie, Lutheran, Old East Paint Creek, Old West Paint Creek, Reynolds Plot, Roese Plot and West Paint Creek Synod.

References

External links
 US-Counties.com
 City-Data.com

Townships in Allamakee County, Iowa
Townships in Iowa
1856 establishments in Iowa
Populated places established in 1856